Dancemania 6 is the sixth set in the Dancemania series of dance music compilation albums, released in mid-1997 by EMI Music Japan.

The album debuted at #10 on Oricon's weekly album chart in July 1997 and remained within the top 20 positions on the chart for 4 consecutive weeks.

Several tracks on the album, including different remixes, can also be found on other Dancemania albums such as X9, Delux 2, Delux 4, Delux 5, Extra, Zip Mania II, Speed 2, Speed 4, Speed Best 2001, Summers, Bass #1, Bass #9, Bass #10, Super Techno, Scorccio Super Hit Mix, Best Red or Happy Paradise.


Tracks

Further details

The album's overall average tempo is 137 bpm;
The lowest bpm is 130 (#7-9).
The highest bpm is 146 (#20).
The album contains 6 covers or remixes.
#2 "Holiday" is a cover of Madonna's "Holiday".
#4 "2 Become 1" is a cover of Spice Girls' "2 Become 1".
#14 "Just Playin'" sampled Sister Sledge's "Greatest Dancer".
#15 "S.O.S." is a cover of ABBA's "S.O.S.".
#16 "Fame" is a cover of Irene Cara's "Fame".
#22 "Somewhere Over the Rainbow" is a cover of Judy Garland's "Over the Rainbow".
The non-stop mixing was done by Jonas Thorne, a DJ based in Sweden and Norway.

References

6
1997 compilation albums
Dance music compilation albums